Bačko Novo Selo (Serbian Cyrillic: Бачко Ново Село ) is a village in Serbia. It is situated in the Bač municipality, South Bačka District, Vojvodina province. The village has a Serb ethnic majority and a Bosniak minority. Its population numbering 1,228 people (2002 census). The village was formally known as Batsch Neudorf prior to World War Two.

History
Bačko Novo Selo was historically populated by Danube Swabians. Following the end of the Second World War, the Yugoslav Communist authorities displaced the German population of the village and resettled families from Bosnia. The Yugoslav Communist authorities aimed to develop Bačko Novo Selo into a Muslim colony of Vojvodina, however by the spring of 1947, only an estimated 138 out of an expected 320 Muslim families settled in Bačko Novo Selo.

Geography
Neighbouring places are Plavna and Mladenovo (both located in Bačka), as well as Sotin and Opatovac, which are situated across the Danube in the Croatian part of Syrmia.

Historical population

1961: 2,236
1971: 1,665
1981: 1,522
1991: 1,365

Famous residents
Refik Memišević, wrestle champion, born in 1956 in Bačko Novo Selo
Refik Kozić, footballer, born in 1950 in Bačko Novo Selo

Gallery

See also
List of places in Serbia
List of cities, towns and villages in Vojvodina

References
Slobodan Ćurčić, Broj stanovnika Vojvodine, Novi Sad, 1996.

External links 

www.backonovoselo.com
Bačko Novo Selo
Bačko Novo Selo
Bačko Novo Selo 

Places in Bačka
Bač, Serbia
South Bačka District
Populated places on the Danube